West Pymble is a suburb on the Upper North Shore of Sydney in the state of New South Wales, Australia  north-west of the Sydney Central Business District in the local government area of Ku-ring-gai Council. Pymble is a separate suburb to the east, sharing the postcode of 2073.

History
The land on which West Pymble was built was Guringai country, until European arrival brought disease which greatly reduced the population. By 1824, Aboriginal people in the area had been reduced to 'the remains of an Aboriginal tribe', who periodically walked through the area on their way from Bobbin Head to Pymble Hill. Early European settler Robert Pymble told his grandchildren that the Aboriginal people had gone by 1856.

Logging was the first industry of the area, with both government logging camps and private contractors felling the biggest trees and dragging them to the Lane Cove River or local sawpits. The Lofberg family, who were established in the area by the 1860s, shipped lumber to the Sydney markets on their boats, and raised nine children on their farm in West Pymble.

The rugged country and sloping land of West Pymble was slower to be settled than surrounding flatter areas, and became a bush haven for absconded convicts, illicit stills, gambling and cockfighting.

As the timber was felled, land was used for orchards, and by the 1880s growing citrus, apples, pears and stone fruit was a major industry. The Lofberg, Kendall and Munday families grew fruit and raised pigs on their mixed farms. These enterprises survived into the 1920s, although the arrival of codling moth decreased fruit growing, and the construction of the North Shore railway line in the 1890s made the land more valuable as residential property. 
Pymble soon boasted Hamilton Bros Universal Providers, near the station and other businesses.
The Lofbergs diversified into quarrying, with their sandstone quarry being taken over by the Ku-ring-gai Council in 1926, to provide materials for roads and footpaths in the municipality.

West Pymble was subdivided between 1900 and 1915, but was still sparsely populated because of its distance from the railway at Pymble. Much of the area remained semi-rural throughout the interwar period.

Much of the area was developed after the Second World War (mainly in the 1950s and 1960s) with defence personnel housing and homes for returning soldiers built in brand new streets pushed through the bush. West Pymble's war memorial hall was opened in 1962 on the Lofbergs' original landholding on Lofberg Road. The original housing style included three-bedroom weatherboard cottages. Many remain but a lot of them have been significantly extended and/or upgraded since; others have been demolished and replaced with larger homes.

West Gordon Public School opened in 1951, and later West Pymble Public School in 1960 to educate the children of the new residents, and the inhabitants of the Bernard Smith Children's home, run by the Central Methodist Mission from 1960 to 1988.

The section of West Pymble, on the eastern side of Ryde Road, including Kiparra St, Dunoon Avenue, Wyuna Avenue and adjoining streets, was originally designated "West Gordon" and it was considered to be part of the suburb of Gordon.  However, in 1990, the suburban boundaries were reviewed and this neighbourhood became re-designated as part of West Pymble instead, although the name of the public primary school did not change.

Pymble West Post Office opened on 1 December 1958 and closed in 1974.

Commercial area

The Philip Mall, located on Kendall Street, is a street mall with two rows of shops facing each other. Philip Mall includes an IGA supermarket, hairdresser, beauty salon, takeaway, greengrocer, bread shop, newsagent, cafe & deli, a cafe, Chinese restaurant, butcher, pizza shop, pharmacy, chocolate shop, bottle shop, ATM, physiotherapist, dentist and a veterinary clinic.  Nearby is a BP petrol station.

Philip Mall was redeveloped in the 1990s. The development included the removal of gardens between two shops which had become largely dilapidated. Some of the gardens were replanted with the rest of the area paved, which significantly increased space in the mall. Seating and additional bicycle stands were installed. At the same time the large children's playground was upgraded with improved safety features and playsets.

In 1998 the Boonah Creative Arts Centre was established in the old community centre, operated by the Sisters of Mercy. The Boonah Centre provides fine arts education to mentally disabled persons.

In 2012, Philip Mall was re-landscaped, with the centre area between the shops being gutted, and a new layout built to give more space to allow shoppers to move between the 2 lines of shops.

The Philip Mall shops association is the West Pymble Chamber of Commerce which organises many events of interest to and including the local community.

The Gordon West Shops are in Duneba Avenue, West Pymble. They include a dentist, hair salon, German and Italian restaurants.  The Gordon West shops are a significantly smaller group than Philip Mall shops.

Transport
However, it is difficult to access from West Pymble, and bus services such as Transdev NSW's Route 560 run from West Pymble to Gordon railway station in a loop service. Transdev also runs two bus services, route 575, from Macquarie University to Hornsby railway station via Pymble & Turramurra and also Route 572 from Macquarie University to Turramurra railway station via South Turramurra and West Pymble, which Route 575 previously operated prior to 2012. In addition, Forest Coach Lines' Route 197 runs along Ryde Road through West Pymble from Macquarie University to Gordon Station, then onwards to Mona Vale via St Ives, Austlink & Terrey Hills.

Inner Suburb:
 560 – Gordon Station [operated by Transdev NSW]
 572 – Turramurra Station via South Turramurra LoopMacquarie Centre & University [operated by Transdev NSW]

Ryde Road
 575 – Hornsby Station via Pymble, Turramurra, North Wahroonga, Hornsby HospitalMacquarie Centre & University [operated by Transdev NSW]
 197 – Mona Vale via Gordon Station, St Ives Shops, Austlink & Terrey HillsMacquarie Centre & University via Macquarie Park Station [operated by Forest Coaches]

The Comenarra Parkway is an arterial road that runs from West Pymble (Yanko Road) to Thornleigh via South Turramurra and Wahroonga.

Parks
West Pymble is surrounded by Lane Cove National Park and provides excellent bushwalking opportunities.

The Bicentennial Park oval complex in Lofberg Road consists of netball courts, soccer and cricket fields, a public swimming pool, a children's playground and barbecue facilities. The park was originally a quarry and later a bike track until it was regenerated in 1988 to coincide with the Australian Bicentenary.

Other parks in the area include:
Frogmore Park, Wyomee Avenue
Shoppers Rest
Shoppers Glen
Ramsay Avenue Park
Claire Taylor Park

Schools
West Pymble Public School, Apollo Avenue, a government primary school
Gordon West Public School (is actually in West Pymble), a government primary school
Our Lady of Perpetual Succour Catholic Primary School, Kendall Street, a Catholic primary school
West Pymble Pre-school, Lofberg Road, a private pre-school
 ABC Learning day care centre, Kendall Street

Places of worship
St Matthew's Anglican church, Eppleston Place [www.stmatthewswestpymble.org.au]
Our Lady of Perpetual Succour Catholic Church, Kendall Street

Sports and Recreation

Community groups and organised activities
West Pymble Cricket Club – Lofberg Oval
West Pymble Scout Group – Bicentennial Park
Rover Scouts – for young people aged 18–25 – groups at nearby Kissing Point & Turramurra
Girl Guides – Bicentennial Park
Dance classes – held in the old SES hall on Lofberg Road
Netball training – Bicentennial Park
West Pymble Football Club – Norman Griffiths Oval
Boonah Creative Arts Centre – Philip Mall, Kendall Street
Killara West Pymble Rugby Union Football Club – Lofberg Oval

Sporting facilities
Cricket pitch and training nets, Lofberg Road
Netball Courts with night lighting, Bicentennial Park
Football oval and club house, Lofberg Road
West Pymble Bowling and Sports club
Swimming Pools – heated 25m and 50m, covered children's splash pool, Bicentennial Park
Tennis Courts, Kendall Street

Demographics
Of these: 
 64.5% of families were couple families with children, a higher proportion than the national average of 44.7%; the median age was 40 years, compared to the national median of 38 years. Children aged under 15 years made up 24.1% of the population (national average is 18.7%) and people aged 65 years and over made up 15.5% of the population (national average is 15.8%).
 69.2% of people were born in Australia. The most common countries of birth were England 5.2%, China 3.3% and New Zealand 2.0%; 77.5% of people only spoke English at home. Other languages spoken at home included Mandarin 4.2%, Cantonese 3.3% and Korean 2.0%.
 The most common responses for religion were No Religion 28.3%, Catholic 24.1% and Anglican 20.7%.
 The median household weekly income was $2,855, nearly double the national median of $1,438. Real estate was correspondingly expensive; the median mortgage repayment was $3,000 compared to the national median of $1,755.
 Separate houses constitute the overwhelming majority (96.5%) of residences.  The average household size was 3.2 people.

Notable residents
 Mel Gibson was raised in West Pymble after his family moved to Australia.
 Actress Jacki Weaver spent her teen years in West Pymble.
 Rai Thistlethwayte of Thirsty Merc grew up in West Pymble
 Shane Gould an Olympic swimmer grew up in West Pymble
 Johnny O'Keefe lived in West Pymble
 Christine Jensen Burke lives in West Pymble
 Peter Garrett attended Gordon West Primary school

References

External links 
 
West Pymble Out of School Care – on the grounds of West Pymble Public School
Ku-ring-gai Council

Suburbs of Sydney
Ku-ring-gai Council